Plateau de Beille (Occitan: Plan de Belha) is a ski resort in the Pyrenees. It is situated in the Ariège department, and in the region of the Occitanie.

For a long time, this plateau was only a place of livestock, especially cattle. It has recently become the site of a large winter sports resort of the Pyrenees, mainly dedicated to the practice of cross-country skiing, with tracks between  altitude. The ski station is located between Tarascon-sur-Ariège and Ax-les-Thermes, close to the Spanish border, and above the communes of Les Cabannes, Albiès and Vèbre. Road access to the plateau (the D522) starts from Les Cabannes. Moreover, the Plateau de Beille is a crossing point of the GR 10 hiking trail that crosses the Pyrenees from east to west.

Since 1998, the ascent from Les Cabannes to the plateau has regularly been used as the final ascent of a stage in the Tour de France. On the first four such occasions, the stage winner at Plateau de Beille also emerged as the winner of the general classification of that Tour.

Geography

The plateau ends at the south by the Col de Finestres at  where it passes the GR 10; to the north, the slope falls steeply to the Ariège Valley.

Geology
The substrate of the plateau is essentially composed of gneiss (gneiss of Riète or Aston), i.e. a granite metamorphosed by plutonic lifts. Formed during the Cenozoic, it suffered a first uprising during the formation of the Pyrenees about 40 to 50 million years ago, various levels between 25 million years and 10 million years ago, then a new uprising. In the Quaternary, its perimeter was determined by deep glacial valleys.

Flora and fauna
The Plateau de Beille is a Zone naturelle d'intérêt écologique, faunistique et floristique [Natural Zone of Ecological  Interest, Fauna and Flora] (ZNIEFF) type I. Its habitat consists of short lawns, forests of Pinus uncinata at altitude, a beech-fir forest on its lower slopes, moorland and some bogs. In the bogs are oblong-leaved sundew (Drosera intermedia), round-leaved sundew (Drosera rotundifolia) and bog club moss (Lycopodiella inundata), rare and protected species, but also the marsh cinquefoil (Comarum palustre) and tussock cottongrass (Eriophorum vaginatum).

With regard to wildlife, of particular note is the presence of the capercaillie, the golden eagle, the bearded vulture and, for mammals, the European pine marten (Martes martes) and the Pyrenean chamois.

Sport

Ski resort
Created in 1988, the Plateau de Beille Nordic ski resort was opened in 1989. The facilities include  of cross-country trails,  of snowshoe trails, a biathlon stadium and a school for dog sledding. In summer activities are organised for, among other things, scooters hauled by sled dogs and discovery walks concerning pastoralism. Mountain biking trails follow the route of the cross-country ski slopes. It is a daytime station, with the exception of bivouacs in light structures, which have been implemented from 2007, no accommodation is guaranteed.

With regard to attendance and turnover, in 2008 Beille was the first Nordic ski station in the Pyrenees and the 4th at the French level. 

Cycling

The Plateau de Beille is a regular place of various races.

Details of climb
The maximum gradient is 10.8%.

It is a formidable ascent. The first  are generally done under forest canopy and the last  are uncovered through the pastures, where cattle sometimes cross the road.

While the valley roads are virtually flat, as soon as leaving the central square of Les Cabannes, riders face a very steep ramp to arrive at the height of the Château de Gudanes (commune of Château-Verdun). During the first kilometres, the tar road surface is smooth but then becomes granular, which adds to the difficulty. The percentages are often higher than 8%; the 9th kilometre, preceding Henry IV fountain, is one of the steepest sections.

After leaving the forest, the percentages are slightly lower but more irregular. At the 12th kilometre, it passes the Cabanne de Pierrefite with a short flat part followed by a difficult break in gradient.

Tour de France

Since its discovery by the Tour de France in 1998, the Plateau de Beille has served as stage finish six times (in 1998, 2002, 2004, 2007, 2011 and 2015). The ascent is ranked as hors catégorie in the mountains classification.

On the first four occasions, the stage winner has gone on to win the Tour: Marco Pantani in 1998, Lance Armstrong in 2002 and 2004 (but whose titles were removed from him in October 2012), and Alberto Contador in 2007 who won the Tour de France as a result of the exclusion of the Danish Michael Rasmussen.

Tour de France stage finishes

 

Route du Sud
The Plateau de Beille has also been used seven times for a stage finish of the Route du Sud.

1995:  Carmelo Mirando
1996:  Giuseppe Guerini
1997:  Laurent Roux
1998:  Armand de Las Cuevas
1999:  Lance Armstrong
2001:  Francesco Casagrande
2002:  Levi Leipheimer (ITT)

Gallery

See also

2007 Tour de France, stage 14
2011 Tour de France, stage 14

Bibliography

General

Cycling

References

External links
Article with stage profile and map 
Profile and declivity from Les Cabannes 

Ski stations in France
Tourist attractions in Ariège (department)
Plateaus of Metropolitan France
Landforms of Ariège (department)